The women's sabre competition in fencing at the 2016 Summer Olympics in Rio de Janeiro was held on 8 August at the Carioca Arena 3.

The medals were presented by Irena Szewińska, IOC member, Poland and Stanislav Pozdnyakov, President of the European Fencing Confederation and Russian Olympic Committee.

Results

Finals

Top half

Section 1

Section 2

Bottom half

Section 3

Section 4

Results

References

Women's sabre
2016 in women's fencing
Women's events at the 2016 Summer Olympics